Julian Guttau (born 29 October 1999) is a German professional footballer who plays as a midfielder for SC Freiburg II.

Career
Guttau started out his football career in the youth department of SG Einheit Halle as a five-year-old, reportedly scoring 168 goals in 106 games for the club at youth level. He grew up as a fan of Schalke 04. Guttau moved to the academy of Hallescher FC in the summer of 2011. It was there that he made his first professional appearance in the 3. Liga when he came on as a halftime substitute for Mathias Fetsch on 15 September 2018, the seventh matchday of the 2018–19 season in a 1–2 away defeat against KFC Uerdingen 05.

References

External links
 
 

1999 births
Living people
Sportspeople from Halle (Saale)
Footballers from Saxony-Anhalt
German footballers
Association football midfielders
3. Liga players
Hallescher FC players
SC Freiburg II players